Frédéric Cermeno (born 20 June 1979 in Perpignan), is a French rugby league and rugby union player. He has played at club level for USA Perpignan.

Career
Frédéric Cermeno began playing Rugby Union with USA Perpignan where he was finalist for the Heineken Cup. He moved to Castres Olympique in 2006. The next year he played the Pro D2 with AS Béziers Hérault. He earned his only cap playing for the French national team on 28 May 2000 against the Romania at Bucharest. In 2009 he joined Pia Donkeys in rugby league.

External links 
 Frédéric Cermeno International Statistics

Sportspeople from Perpignan
French rugby league players
French rugby union players
Castres Olympique players
France international rugby union players
USA Perpignan players
1979 births
Living people
AS Béziers Hérault players
Baroudeurs de Pia XIII players
Rugby union fullbacks
Rugby union wings